The 1977–78 Nationle A season was the 57th season of the Nationale A, the top level of ice hockey in France. 10 teams participated in the league, and Gap Hockey Club won their second league title. Hockey Club de Caen was relegated to the Nationale B.

Regular season

Relegation
 Club des patineurs lyonnais - Sporting Hockey Club Saint Gervais 5:13/3:13

External links
Season on hockeyarchives.info

Fra
1977–78 in French ice hockey
Ligue Magnus seasons